Sister Sledge is an American musical vocal group from Philadelphia, Pennsylvania. Formed in 1971, the group consisted of sisters Debbie, Joni, Kim, and Kathy Sledge. The siblings achieved international success at the height of the disco era. In 1979, they released their breakthrough album We Are Family, which peaked at number three on the Billboard 200 and included the 1979 US top-10 singles "He's the Greatest Dancer" and "We Are Family". A third single, "Lost in Music", reached the US top 40. "We Are Family" earned a Grammy Award nomination for Best R&B Performance by a Duo or Group with Vocal.

Their other US singles include a 1982 remake of Mary Wells' 1964 hit "My Guy", "Mama Never Told Me" (1973), and "Thinking of You" (1984), before reaching number one on the UK Singles Chart with the song "Frankie" in 1985. Remixed versions of three of their singles in 1993 returned them to the UK Top 20. Although Kathy undertook a solo career in 1989, she continued to tour with the group (with Kathy occasionally rejoining for one-off performances and several releases in the 1990s). In 2015, Sister Sledge performed for Pope Francis at the World Festival of Families in Philadelphia.

Background
Natives of Philadelphia, the sisters: Debra Edwina "Debbie" Sledge (born 1954), Joan Elise "Joni" Sledge (1956–2017), Kim Sledge (born 1957), and Kathy Sledge (born 1959) are the daughters of Broadway tap dancer Edwin Sledge (1923–1996) and actress Florez Sledge (née Williams; 1928–2007) The sisters were given vocal training by their grandmother Viola Williams, a former lyric soprano opera singer and protégé of civil rights leader Mary McLeod Bethune. Under Viola's guidance, they regularly sang at their family church, Williams Temple Christian Methodist Episcopal  until forming a band and performing at charity and political events throughout Philadelphia, aptly named Mrs Williams’ Grandchildren. The sisters graduated from Olney High School: Debbie in 1972, Joni in 1974, Kim in 1975, and Kathy in 1977. By the end of the decade, all four sisters graduated from Temple University in Philadelphia.

Career

Early career
The group toured much of the East Coast, including New York, New Jersey, and home town Philadelphia with Florez acting as their manager (and tour bus driver) and Debbie as musical director. They released their first single "Time Will Tell" in 1971 on local music label Money Back. In 1973, they released the single "Mama Never Told Me", which became a top-20 hit in the UK in 1975, but with the Patrick Grant and Gwen Guthrie single "Love Don’t Go Through No Changes On Me" (released in 1974), the siblings enjoyed their first success. The song was a big hit in Japan, and as a result, the girls were flown to the country to perform at the Tokyo Music Festival, where they won the Silver Prize. The sisters also performed at the Zaire 74 concert in Africa alongside James Brown during the Rumble in the Jungle boxing event.

Sister Sledge's first album, Circle of Love, was released by ATCO (a subsidiary of Atlantic Records) in 1975, and included songs written by Gwen Guthrie and Gwen's then-boyfriend, studio bassist Patrick Grant, who later changed his name to Haras Fyre. The group enjoyed some success in Europe, and as a result, the album Together was recorded in Germany in 1977. Released through the Cotillion label, another Atlantic subsidiary, the album produced a minor hit with the single "Blockbuster Boy" reaching number 61 on the US R&B chart.

International breakthrough 
At something of a crossroads in their careers, the future seemed a little uncertain for the group, but Atlantic Records connected them with producers Nile Rodgers and Bernard Edwards of the band Chic, and the situation changed. After some initial challenges to working collaboratively, the breakthrough album We Are Family was recorded and released by Cotillion on January 22, 1979. The lead single "He’s the Greatest Dancer" charted at number one R&B and was a Top 10 Pop crossover smash, peaking at #9.  In 1979, the record's anthemic title track "We Are Family" followed and became a worldwide smash charting at number two pop and number one R&B. The song and group were nominated for a Grammy Award and "We Are Family" was adopted as the official anthem for the Pittsburgh Pirates, who went on to win the World Series that year. Sister Sledge was duly invited to perform the national anthem at the opening game in front of 45,000 fans.

The album was certified platinum by the RIAA and produced two more classic disco singles, "Lost in Music" and "Thinking of You". Around this time, Debbie Sledge went on maternity leave and the eldest sister, Carol, filled in for her. They were named Billboard Best New Artists. In 1980, their follow-up album Love Somebody Today (also written and produced by Nile Rodgers and Bernard Edwards) was released. The lead single "Love Somebody Today" scored moderately well, charting at number six on the R&B and number 64 on the pop charts. An extensive three-year live tour began and the quartet performed sold-out shows all over the world.

In 1981, Sister Sledge worked with Narada Michael Walden, who produced their fifth studio album, All American Girls. The project was intended as a collaboration, but the resulting album is generally attributed to Narada Michael Walden. The title track became a number-three R&B hit, but the following singles "Next Time You'll Know" and "If You Really Want Me" did only moderate business. As a tribute to the late Bob Marley, a reggae-influenced mix of the album's fourth release "He's Just a Runaway" was recorded at Radio City Music Hall in New York. The girls self-produced their next record The Sisters in 1982. The album spawned the number-14 R&B and number-23 pop hit "My Guy" (a cover of the Mary Wells classic). The group subsequently appeared on the March 1984 episode of The Jeffersons entitled "My Guy, George", in which they performed the song.

Continued European success 
The album Bet Cha Say That to All the Girls was released in 1983, the lead single from which featured American Jazz singer Al Jarreau. The group experienced renewed success in 1984, when Atlantic Records belatedly released "Thinking of You" followed by a Nile Rodgers remix of "Lost in Music" in the UK, the latter peaking at number four. The following year, they released their seventh studio album When the Boys Meet the Girls and continued success in the UK. Released by Atlantic Records, lead single "Frankie" hit the top spot on the UK Singles Chart, spending four weeks at number one.

In 1989, Kathy pursued a solo career, while still active with Sister Sledge for certain shows. Debbie, Joni, and Kim continued to perform as Sister Sledge and in 1992 collaborated with Jean-Paul "Bluey" Maunick from UK acid jazz group Incognito on the single "World Rise and Shine". The song featured on their greatest-hits album And Now…Sledge…Again. The single reached number one in Italy and resulted in the trio hosting their own TV show there. The group (including Kathy) experienced a resurgence of success in the UK the following year when the Sure as Pure remix of "We Are Family" was released and peaked at number five, followed by remixes of "Lost in Music" (number 14) and "Thinking of You" (number 17). A greatest-hits album, The Very Best of Sister Sledge 1973–93, was also released. In 1996, after witnessing a shooting in LA, Joni Sledge wrote the protest song  "Brother, Brother Stop" that was recorded by the trio and featured on a new greatest-hits CD. In 1997, Joni produced the group's eighth studio album, African Eyes, that garnered critical acclaim and was nominated for a Grammy as best-produced CD.

2000–present
In December 2000, Sister Sledge (Kathy, Debbie, Joni, and Kim) performed at the White House for the President and First Lady at the final Christmas party of the Clinton administration. The following year, in the aftermath of 9/11, all four sisters re-recorded "We Are Family" as a benefit record with a host of other artists, including Diana Ross and Patti LaBelle. Debbie, Joni, and Kim produced solo material during this period before being reunited in the studio to record the album Style in 2003. Due to legal difficulties, the project officially remains unreleased. Kim, an ordained minister, took some time out from the group, but soon joined Kathy and Joni on various international shows. Joni and Debbie continued to tour (with various guest artists, including Debbie's daughter Camille Sledge, completing a trio), and in 2005 performed on the famous pyramid stage at the Glastonbury Music Festival in the UK. In 2011, Sister Sledge came together on The Oprah Winfrey Show for the "Women Who Rock" episode. In the summer of 2012, Tanya Tiet was added to their lineup.

In 2014, Sister Sledge headlined at the Tramlines Festival in Sheffield, United Kingdom along with hip-hop icons, Public Enemy, and collaborated with Scottish electronic producer The Revenge, recording the track "Stay a While" in London. With Kim rejoining in 2015, all three sisters performed at a large-scale charity benefit in London for Save the Children and were invited to perform for Pope Francis along with Aretha Franklin and Andrea Bocelli at the World Festival of Families in Philadelphia; the latter performance – at Eakins Oval Stage on September 26, 2015 – was covered by the world's media and went viral due to crowds of nuns in the audience dancing to "We Are Family" (Debbie did not participate in this performance). Debbie, Joni, and Kim soon thereafter launched the brand concept, Nothing is Greater Than Love.

Joni Sledge, born September 13, 1956, died of natural causes at her home in Phoenix, Arizona on March 10, 2017 at age 60. Following Joni's death, Debbie and Kim announced that they will continue to perform as Sister Sledge.

Members

Current members
 Debbie Sledge (1971–present)
 Kim Sledge (1971–present)

Touring members
 Carol Sledge (1979)
 Kristen Lightfoot (2006-2013)
 Reginald Cornell Mack (1979-1993)
 Sue Wingate (2006-2013)
 Tanya Tiet (2012–present)
 Julie Sledge (2018)
 Camille Sledge (2019–present)
 Thaddeus Sledge Whyte IV
 David Sledge Young

Former members
 Kathy Sledge (1971–1989; 1993, 2011, 2023)
 Joni Sledge (1971–2017; her death)

Discography

Studio albums
 Circle of Love (1975)
 Together (1977)
 We Are Family (1979)
 Love Somebody Today (1980)
 All American Girls (1981)
 The Sisters (1982)
 Bet Cha Say That to All the Girls (1983)
 When the Boys Meet the Girls (1985)
 African Eyes (1997)
 Style (2003)

See also
List of number-one dance hits (United States)
List of artists who reached number one on the US Dance chart

References

Further reading
 Arena, James. First Legends of Disco (2014)
 Easlea, Daryl. Everybody Dance, Chic and the Politics of Disco (2004)

External links
  SisterSledge.com
 
 Sister Sledge discography, album releases & credits at Discogs
 Sister Sledge albums to be listened as stream on Spotify

African-American girl groups
American dance music groups
American girl groups
American soul musical groups
American disco groups
American disco girl groups
Family musical groups
Musical groups established in 1971
Musical groups from Philadelphia
1971 establishments in Pennsylvania